Poxoréu (sometimes misspelled as Poxoréo) is a municipality in the state of Mato Grosso in the Central-West Region of Brazil.

The origins of the town date back to June 1924 which is when the first diamond gems were found in the area.

See also
List of municipalities in Mato Grosso

References

Municipalities in Mato Grosso